Robinwood is an exclusive residential section of northwest Little Rock, Arkansas, marked by several large, stately homes among a wooded area near the Arkansas River.  Some of the homes of Robinwood can be seen along the riverside cliffs approaching the city via Interstate 430 from Maumelle.  The area is bordered by the interstate and Pleasant Valley to the west, the Arkansas River to its north, and Old Forge to the south.  The Reservoir Road area, including the city's Reservoir Park, lies to the east.  Development evolved in the Robinwood area during the 1960s and 1970s as Little Rock continued its westward expansion.

Neighborhoods in Little Rock, Arkansas